Casanova is an unincorporated community and census-designated place (CDP) in Centre County, Pennsylvania, United States. It was first listed as a CDP prior to the 2020 census.

The CDP is along the northwestern border of Centre County, in the northern part of Rush Township. It sits within a large bend of Moshannon Creek, which borders the community to the west, north, and east. Across the creek is Clearfield County, with Morris Township to the west and Cooper Township to the north and east. The unincorporated community of Munson is directly to the west across Moshannon Creek. The creek is a northeastward-flowing tributary of the West Branch Susquehanna River.

Casanova Road is the community's main street; it leads west across Moshannon Creek into Munson and southeast  to Pennsylvania Route 504 at Black Moshannon State Park.

Demographics

References 

Census-designated places in Centre County, Pennsylvania
Census-designated places in Pennsylvania